Wildling is a 2018 American horror-fantasy film directed by Fritz Böhm and starring Liv Tyler, Bel Powley, Brad Dourif, Collin Kelly-Sordelet, Mike Faist, and James LeGros. The screenplay was co-written by Böhm and Florian Eder. The plot follows Anna, a blossoming teenager who uncovers the dark secret behind her traumatic childhood. The film premiered at South by Southwest on March 10, 2018 and has received favorable reviews. It was released in the United States in select theaters and on video on demand on April 13, 2018, by IFC Films under their IFC Midnight brand.

Plot
Anna spends her childhood confined in an attic bedroom by the man she believes is her father. He tells her that a child-eating monster called the Wildling roams the woods. When Anna reaches puberty, "Daddy" begins giving Anna daily injections of leuprorelin to prevent her body from maturing, explaining that he is treating her "illness." Anna suffers terrible side effects from the injections and asks "Daddy" to kill her. "Daddy" cannot bring himself to shoot her and instead turns the gun on himself.

Anna awakens in a hospital. "Daddy" has survived but is in intensive care. Anna accepts the offer of sheriff Ellen Cooper to temporarily stay at her home. She befriends Ellen's brother Ray and attends the local high school. Now free of leuprorelin, Anna enters puberty. She develops superhuman hearing and feels drawn to the forest and the Northern Lights.

A DNA test reveals that "Daddy" is not Anna's biological father. Ray takes Anna to a party where they share a brief romantic moment. Anna's mouth suddenly begins bleeding. After rushing to the bathroom, she loses some teeth. Anna flees out the window. Outside, local bully Lawrence tries to rape her and she rips out his throat with her teeth. Confused and frightened, Anna realizes that sharper teeth are pushing out her human teeth and her nails are slowly becoming claw-like.

In the woods, she encounters a one-eyed outdoorsman in a wolf pelt. He tells her that he has not seen one of her kind since the town conducted "the purge" sixteen years ago. He tells her she will find her mother in a nearby cavern. Anna discovers a fanged skull with a bullet hole in the forehead. Anna suddenly remembers "Daddy" shooting her mother. "Daddy", who was participating in the purge, could not bring himself to shoot the human-looking baby Anna and instead he hid her away.

Anna returns to Ellen's home, where Ellen handcuffs her, apologizing and explaining that the police have discovered Lawrence's body beside the dress Anna was wearing. Anna is jailed. That night, "Daddy" visits her and tells her that sparing her life was his greatest mistake, as it meant breaking his oath "to kill all the Wildlings." He hands her a syringe with a lethal dose of leuprorelin, urging her to take it. Anna refuses. The next morning when Ellen checks on her, Anna locks her in the cell and escapes.

Ray drives Anna north into the forest. Abandoning the car, they go into the woods. That night, they have sex as Ray feels hair growing on Anna's back. The next morning, Anna finds claws on her feet that Ray compliments. They are ambushed by "Daddy" and a group of hunters. During their escape, Ray is shot in the arm. Knowing that Ray's life is in danger, Anna runs the other way, leading the hunting party away.

Three months later, Anna has transformed almost fully into a Wildling. Ellen follows the hunters on one of their expeditions into the forest where Anna kills several of them including Deputy Roger Fowler who held Ellen at gunpoint. Ellen allows Anna to escape after seeing that she is pregnant. The hunters set the forest on fire, driving Anna to dig underground. After Anna rips off her clothes where her feet are now stretched out, Anna is tranquilized by "Daddy" who attempts to perform a c-section on her to claim the unborn child. Anna fights off the drugs and kills "Daddy". Anna wakes up with the outdoorsman stitching her wounds.

The next morning Ellen and Ray see Anna from afar. They allow her to escape into the wilderness.

In the final scene, a fully transformed Anna has traveled far north as she cradles her newborn child under the Northern Lights. In the distance, she hears the call of another Wildling, indicating that there is a possibility that a few Wildlings survived the purge.

Cast
 Liv Tyler as Ellen Cooper, Sheriff of Onatah County
 Bel Powley as Anna, a teenager who is secretly a Wildling.
 Aviva Winick as Little Anna
 Arlo Mertz as toddler Anna
 Brad Dourif as "Daddy", a man who took in a younger Anna.
 Collin Kelly-Sordelet as Ray Cooper, the brother of Ellen.
 James LeGros as Wolf Man, a mysterious person who tells Anna of her Wildling origins.
 Mike Faist as Lawrence Fuller, a bully that picks on Ray.
 Troy Ruptash as Roger Fowler, a deputy who works for Ellen and is friends with "Daddy".
 Trevor E. Dickerson as a Wildling that Anna hallucinated seeing Lawrence as.
 Alina Cho as the voice of the newscaster
 Patrick M. Walsh, Brian Donahue, and Don Hewitt as the Hunters

Production
Wildling is the directorial feature debut of Fritz Böhm, who also co-wrote the screenplay with Florian Eder. The film was produced by Maven Pictures (US) in co-production with Arri Media (German), Film i Väst and Filmgate Films (both Swedish) and in association with IM Global and Night Fox Entertainment.

International sales were handled by IM Global, which first introduced the film to buyers at the European Film Market (EFM) during the 2016 Berlin International Film Festival. On February 18, 2016 Screen International announced that UK rights were acquired by Warner Bros. On February 19, 2016 Deadline Hollywood reported the closing of distribution deals for Latin America, South Africa, Switzerland, Portugal, Middle East, Turkey, Thailand, Israel, Ex-Yugoslavia, Indonesia, Malaysia, Baltic States and Vietnam. On February 7, 2018, Variety reported acquisition of the film's release rights in the United States by IFC Films.

Casting 
On October 5, 2015, Deadline Hollywood announced the casting of Bel Powley and Liv Tyler for the lead roles.

In an interview with Film Inquiry, Bel Powley talked about what originally drew her to the film, saying, "I've always wanted projects that kind of subvert tradition and the norm, and I think that's something that Wildling really did from the first draft I read." With Inverse, Powley described the film as a "story about becoming a woman in our society and the obstacles you're faced with." In an interview with Vulture she explained, "What Anna goes through in the movie is symbolic of what every girl goes through when they become a woman."

Brad Dourif said in an interview with Rue Morgue, "When I was first offered the part [of Daddy] I wasn't initially going to do it. But before I actually said no, I wanted to talk to the director [Fritz Böhm] first. I told him about how, as a parent, I was interested in the idea of it, but that I wanted to play the character in a certain way. We worked through it, and after our discussion I wanted to be a part of the film. It was really the theme of fatherhood that compelled me to take it on."

Photography 
Production was first announced on October 5, 2015 and filming took place in late 2015 over 23 shooting days in various locations in the state of New York, including a natural stretch of the Bronx River within the Bronx Zoo, the town of Congers, the Sleepy Hollow police station, Rockland Lake State Park and Inwood Hill Park, Manhattan. In an interview with Deadline Hollywood, Böhm spoke about the challenges of working with child actors, water scenes, animals and special effects makeup on a limited budget and schedule. During a Q&A in the Arena Cinelounge Hollywood, Böhm revealed that the film's elaborate cave sequences were entirely shot in a warehouse in Brooklyn against blue screen, "since real caves don't exist within the 23 mile radius of Columbus Circle, Manhattan in which the movie had to be shot in order to fulfill the requirements for New York City's film incentive program."

Production designer Lauren Fitzsimmons told audiences at South by Southwest that the attic of "Daddy's house", which is seen in the first 15 minutes of the film, was a set she "built in the same Brooklyn warehouse in which the cave scenes were shot". In a Q&A at the IFC Center (New York City) moderated by Boaz Yakin, Böhm explained that, during the editing process, he drove to the Redwood National Forest in Northern California to shoot additional nature footage by himself as a "one man second unit".

Post-production 
Böhm worked with Arri Media in Munich, Germany where the film was mixed in the Dolby Atmos format. The film was color-timed by Florian "Utsi" Martin, and film editor Peter Boyle served as creative consultant in the editing process. The film comprises roughly 350 visual effect shots, for which Böhm utilized his background as a post-production supervisor and visual effects artist in his native Germany.

Release

DVD and Blu-ray release in the United States was on August 7, 2018.

Other theatrical releases included Russia on June 22, 2018 (as САГА О ЧУДОВИЩЕ. СУМЕРКИ) and Turkey on June 22, 2018 (as Yabani)

Rating
The Motion Picture Association of America gave the film an R rating "for violence including bloody images, language, some sexual content and teen drinking." The British Board of Film Classification rated the film suitable for 15 years or older for "strong bloody images, threat and language".

Soundtrack
It features the film's score composed by Paul Haslinger, and the main title song "Wildling" written, performed and produced by Linda Perry.

Reception
The site's critics' consensus reads: "Wildling's feminist themes – and the ferocious Bel Powley performance that brings them to life – are often enough to make up for its narrative deficiencies." On Metacritic, the film has a weighted average score of 58 out of 100, based on 10 critics, indicating "mixed or average reviews".

The Hollywood Reporter included Wildling in their "10 Best Films of SXSW 2018". The Hollywood Reporters Justin Lowe wrote in his review "Whether representing an unsettling allegory of adolescence or a fortuitous convergence of contemporary social issues, IFC Midnight's April release will provide a new perspective on themes of female empowerment before carving out a unique niche in home entertainment formats." Entertainment Weekly gave the film a B+ score with reviewer Leah Greenblatt calling the film "a clever, sharp-fanged mélange of classic midnight-movie horror and modern indie ingenuity." She wrote further, "As Bohm, assisted by vivid visuals from Get Out DP Toby Oliver, steers Wildling toward its gruesome, hallucinatory climax, the film loses something in logic but gains a visceral, almost volcanic momentum." Los Angeles Timess Noel Murray wrote "At its best, Wildling is very smart about how we humans like to compare ourselves to animals" and wrote the film "offers a darker, artier take on one of the classic horror premises: the misunderstood adolescent monster." Sara Stewart of New York Post called the film "skillfully directed" and pointed out Bel Powley's performance, "Powley uses her expressive face perfectly as the guileless Anna."

Ben Kenigsberg of The New York Times called Wildling a "creature feature" that is "functional but lacks flavor." Kenigsberg noted that Powley "is well suited to her character’s wide-eyed wonderment" but found the movie suffers "when she turns into a special effect".

/Films Meredith Borders called Wildling "such an assured debut, darkly mystical and elegant" and described the film as "a really smart approach to an ageless tale" with "great performances and some extremely effective gore." Jacob Knight of Birth.Movies.Death called the film "beautifully composed" and said that "Bel Powley is incredible as Anna". Vicki Woods of Morbidly Beautiful called the film "a powerful fable". She wrote in her review, "Wildling is a moodily atmospheric thriller combining supernatural scares with a myth-like tale of self-discovery and a beautiful coming-of-age tale" and "the acting throughout is terrific, but it is Bel Powley that takes the movie to another level." Heather Wixon of Daily Dead wrote, "Powley delivers a truly powerful portrayal". Charles Early wrote on Austin360, "Director Fritz Bohm has created a misunderstood creature for the ages". Brian Williams of The Hollywood Outsider wrote, "The masterful direction of Wildling cannot be overstated. With only a two million dollar budget, Böhm pulls off a cinematic miracle that can only be compared to some of the independent upstart movies like Desperado and Clerks in that the budget-to-quality ratio is off the charts."

Alex Arabian of Film Inquiry called Wildling a "wildly original creature feature that transcends the horror genre" and the third act "visually rewarding". He wrote "Wildling is a film about growing up as an outsider, becoming a woman, being free from oppression, and loving your body as it is." He also pointed out the performances by the main cast, writing "Horror legend, iconic character actor, and Oscar nominee Brad Dourif, Liv Tyler, and rising star Bel Powley (The Diary of a Teenage Girl) give a trio of superb performances. As the central and titular character, Powley delivers yet another powerhouse performance, following her The Diary of a Teenage Girl and Carrie Pilby roles." He also noted the work of cinematographer Toby Oliver, writing he did "a phenomenal job lighting and shooting the film". Paul D'Agostino of Hyperallergic called the film "captivating" and wrote "Fritz Böhm's debut film Wildling is cloaked in mystery, dark and dank, occasionally bloody, sometimes shocking, and fantastically folkloric." D'Agostino compared Wildling to Tomas Alfredson's Let The Right One In and a number of films by Guillermo del Toro and M. Night Shyamalan.

Looper called Wildling "one of the best movies of 2018".

References

External links
 
 
 Wildling at Amazon.com
 Wildling at iTunes Store

2018 films
2018 horror films
2010s coming-of-age films
2010s fantasy drama films
2010s monster movies
2010s psychological horror films
2010s teen drama films
2010s teen horror films
American coming-of-age films
American monster movies
American psychological horror films
American psychological drama films
American teen drama films
American teen horror films
American dark fantasy films
American fantasy drama films
Films shot in New York City
American horror drama films
2010s teen fantasy films
Films produced by Trudie Styler
Films scored by Paul Haslinger
2018 drama films
2010s English-language films
2010s American films